Oku or OKU may refer to:

Oku, Cameroon, subdivision in the Northwest Region of Cameroon
 Lake Oku, a crater lake on the Bamenda Plateau in the Northwest Region of Cameroon
 Mount Oku, the largest volcano in the Oku Massif, in the Cameroon Volcanic Line
Oku language, a Grassfields Bantu language of Cameroon
Oku people (Sierra Leone), an ethnic group of Yoruba descent in Sierra Leone. 
Ökü, a village in Azerbaijan
Oku District, Okayama, a former district located in Okayama Prefecture, Japan
Oku, Okayama, a former town in the district, merged with other towns to create the city of Setouchi
Oku (surname), a common Japanese surname
Princess Ōku (661–702), a Japanese princess during the Asuka period in Japanese history
OKU, IATA Airport Code for Mokuti Lodge Airport in Namibia
Ogan Komering Ulu Regency, a province in South Sumatra, Indonesia

See also
Oku Station (disambiguation), several train stations in Japan